Five Points is an unincorporated community in Goshen Township, Champaign County, Ohio, United States.

References 

Unincorporated communities in Champaign County, Ohio